The Qatar Cup (formerly known as Qatar Crown Prince Cup) is a tournament in men's football. It is played by the top 4 teams of the Qatar Stars League after each season. In 2013, the tournament was renamed Qatar Cup.

Previous winners

All-time top scorers

Top-Performing Clubs

References

External links
Cup at soccerway.com
 Qatar Crown Prince Cup – Hailoosport.com (Arabic)
 Qatar Crown Prince Cup – Hailoosport.com

 
Crown
National association football supercups